The 1969 UMass Redmen baseball team represented the University of Massachusetts Amherst in the 1969 NCAA University Division baseball season. The Redmen played their home games at Varsity Field. The team was coached by Dick Bergquist in his 3rd year as head coach at UMass.

The Redmen won the District I to advance to the College World Series, where they were defeated by the Arizona State Sun Devils.

Roster

Schedule

! style="" | Regular Season
|- valign="top" 

|- bgcolor="#ffcccc"
| 1 || March 23 || at  || Unknown • Belmont, North Carolina || 0–6 || 0–1 || –
|- bgcolor="#ffcccc"
| 2 || March 24 || at  || Unknown • Columbia, South Carolina || 2–10 || 0–2 || –
|- bgcolor="#ffcccc"
| 3 || March 25 || at  || Riggs Field • Clemson, South Carolina || 10–16 || 0–3 || –
|- bgcolor="#ccffcc"
| 4 || March 26 || at Clemson || Riggs Field • Clemson, South Carolina || 9–13 || 0–4 || –
|- bgcolor="#ccffcc"
| 5 || March 27 || at  || Ernie Shore Field • Winston-Salem, North Carolina || 7–6 || 1–4 || –
|- bgcolor="#ccffcc"
| 6 || March 28 || at Wake Forest || Ernie Shore Field • Winston-Salem, North Carolina || 16–10 || 2–4 || –
|- bgcolor="#ffcccc"
| 7 || March 29 || at  || Tech Park • Blacksburg, Virginia || 4–12 || 2–5 || –
|-

|- bgcolor="#ccffcc"
| 8 || April 10 || at  || J. O. Christian Field • Storrs, Connecticut || 4–1 || 3–5 || 1–0
|- bgcolor="#ccffcc"
| 9 || April 12 || at  || John Shea Field • Boston, Massachusetts || 8–3 || 4–5 || 1–0
|- bgcolor="#ccffcc"
| 10 || April 14 ||  || Varsity Field • Amherst, Massachusetts || 29–0 || 5–5 || 1–0
|- bgcolor="#ccffcc"
| 11 || April 20 ||  || Unknown • Springfield, Massachusetts || 16–4 || 6–5 || 1–0
|- bgcolor="#ccffcc"
| 12 || April 21 ||  || UnknoVarsity Fieldwn • Amherst, Massachusetts || 10–3 || 7–5 || 2–0
|- bgcolor="#ccffcc"
| 13 || April 21 || Vermont || Varsity Field • Amherst, Massachusetts || 7–6 || 8–5 || 3–0
|- bgcolor="#ccffcc"
| 14 || April 24 ||  || Varsity Field • Amherst, Massachusetts || 11–5 || 9–5 || 4–0
|- bgcolor="#ccffcc"
| 15 || April 26 ||  || Varsity Field • Amherst, Massachusetts || 7–2 || 10–5 || 5–0
|- bgcolor="#ccffcc"
| 16 || April 29 || Connecticut || Varsity Field • Amherst, Massachusetts || 4–0 || 11–5 || 6–0
|- bgcolor="#ccffcc"
| 17 || April 30 || at  || Red Rolfe Field • Hanover, New Hampshire || 12–6 || 12–5 || 6–0
|-

|- bgcolor="#ffcccc"
| 18 || May 2 ||  || Varsity Field • Amherst, Massachusetts || 8–12 || 12–6 || 6–1
|- bgcolor="#ccffcc"
| 19 || May 3 || Maine || Varsity Field • Amherst, Massachusetts || 12–2 || 13–6 || 7–1
|- bgcolor="#ccffcc"
| 20 || May 5 || at  || Unknown • Williamstown, Massachusetts || 3–0 || 14–6 || 7–1
|- bgcolor="#ccffcc"
| 21 || May 7 || at Rhode Island || Bill Beck Field • Kingston, Rhode Island || 4–1 || 15–6 || 8–1
|- bgcolor="#ccffcc"
| 22 || May 10 || at New Hampshire || Brackett Field • Durham, New Hampshire || 13–8 || 16–6 || 9–1
|- bgcolor="#ccffcc"
| 23 || May 12 || at  || Unknown • Amherst, Massachusetts || 8–2 || 17–6 || 9–1
|- bgcolor="#ffcccc"
| 24 || May 15 ||  || Varsity Field • Amherst, Massachusetts || 0–9 || 17–7 || 9–1
|- bgcolor="#ffcccc"
| 25 || May 16 ||  || Varsity Field • Amherst, Massachusetts || 3–4 || 17–8 || 9–1
|- bgcolor="#ccffcc"
| 26 || May 17 ||  || Varsity Field • Amherst, Massachusetts || 6–4 || 18–8 || 9–1
|-

|-
! style="" | Postseason
|- valign="top" 

|- bgcolor="#ccffcc"
| 27 || May 30 || Dartmouth || Varsity Field • Amherst, Massachusetts || 5–2 || 19–8 || 9–1
|- bgcolor="#ccffcc"
| 28 || May 31 || Boston University || Varsity Field • Amherst, Massachusetts || 8–6 || 20–8 || 9–1
|- bgcolor="#ccffcc"
| 29 || June 1 || Boston University || Varsity Field • Amherst, Massachusetts || 6–1 || 21–8 || 9–1
|-

|- bgcolor="#ccffcc"
| 30 || June 14 || vs  || Johnny Rosenblatt Stadium • Omaha, Nebraska || 2–0 || 22–8 || 9–1
|- bgcolor="#ffcccc"
| 31 || June 16 || vs NYU || Johnny Rosenblatt Stadium • Omaha, Nebraska || 2–9 || 22–9 || 9–1
|- bgcolor="#ffcccc"
| 32 || June 17 || vs Arizona State || Johnny Rosenblatt Stadium • Omaha, Nebraska || 2–4 || 22–10 || 9–1
|-

Awards and honors 
Don Anderson
First Team All-Yankee Conference
First Team All-New England
First Team All-Northeast Region

Tony Chinappi
First Team All-Yankee Conference
First Team All-New England
First Team All-Northeast Region

Joe DiSarcina
First Team All-Yankee Conference
First Team All-New England
First Team All-Northeast Region
Third Team All-American Baseball Coaches Association

Ray Ellerbrook
First Team All-Yankee Conference

Bob Hansen
First Team All-Yankee Conference
First Team All-New England
First Team All-Northeast Region
Second Team All-American Baseball Coaches Association

John Kitchen
First Team All-Yankee Conference

Dick Pepin
First Team All-Yankee Conference

Tom Semino
First Team All-Yankee Conference
First Team All-New England
First Team All-Northeast Region

References

UMass Minutemen baseball seasons
UMass Redmen baseball
College World Series seasons
UMass
Yankee Conference baseball champion seasons